Ethnic Chinese in Mozambique once numbered around five thousand individuals, but their population fell significantly during the Mozambican Civil War. After the return of peace and the expansion of Sino-Mozambican economic cooperation, their numbers have been bolstered by new expatriates from the People's Republic of China.

History

Origins
Chinese people began to settle in the land that makes up the modern state of Mozambique as early as the 1870s, when Portuguese influence in East Africa was growing stronger. Portuguese colonialists recruited Chinese carpenters and unskilled labourers in Macao, then also part of the Portuguese Empire, as well as the neighbouring Siyi region of Guangdong, for work on railway construction. Some may not have been voluntary migrants, but criminals sentenced to penal transportation rather than jail. In 1893, the Chinese community in Lourenço Marques (modern-day Maputo) numbered 52 people. One of the more famous of the early migrants was Ja Assam (谢三), a carpenter and architect who funded the construction of Maputo's first Chinese pagoda.

Migration of all Asians was officially halted in 1899 due to an outbreak of plague, blamed on Indians; even after the relaxation of the restriction in 1907, Asians who sought to migrate to the colony had to pay a disembarkation fee of 3,000 reals at their port of arrival. Nevertheless, Chinese population continued to grow, to 287 by 1903. By 1928, there were 314 Chinese in Lourenço Marques alone, rising to 483 by 1935 and 570 by 1940. The vast majority started out in the carpentry trade, but soon moved into shopkeeping. They established five different community associations and a Chinese-language elementary school for their children. By the early 1970s, the eve of independence, there were 5,000 Chinese in Mozambique, with 2,000 in Lourenço Marques and another 3,000 in Beira.

Post-independence
After Mozambique achieved independence in 1975, the Chinese found their business assets and even the buildings held by the Chinese community associations expropriated by the new Communist government, leading many to consider leaving the country. The push to depart was sharpened by the 1977 onset of the Mozambican Civil War. Many emigrated to Portugal. Their arrival preceded that of the main wave of Chinese migration there, consisting of mainland Chinese labourers; the Chinese from Mozambique tended to have far better labour market outcomes in Portugal, due to both their fluent command of Portuguese, and their higher level of education. They commonly found employment as bank tellers, engineers, doctors, and other professionals. Others went to Macau, which remained a Portuguese colony. By the end of the war in 1992, the community had shrunk to a mere several hundred. The descendants of the old Chinese settlers continued to leave the country even with the onset of peace; by 2006, barely twenty families totalling perhaps a hundred people remained in Maputo, while in Beira just two people remained. However, they were replaced by new expatriates from the People's Republic of China, who came to the country as part of the increasing Sino-African economic cooperation.

Numbers
Various sources give different estimates for the size of Mozambique's Chinese community. A 2007 article in the Chinese Academy of Social Sciences journal West Asia And Africa claims that the number is just 1,500, with one-third of those in Maputo. In contrast, the local Chinese embassy estimates the number may be 7,000, and Mozambican immigration officials give a figure of 12,000.

Notable people
Shéu Han, footballer for Benfica and the Portugal national team
Ricardo Rangel, late photojournalist of Chinese descent
Kok Nam,  photojournalist of Chinese descent

References

Notes

Sources

Further reading

Chinese
Mozambique